The Shreveport Kiwanis Invitational was a golf tournament on the LPGA Tour from 1963 to 1970. It was played at three different courses in Louisiana: Alexandria Golf and Country Club in Alexandria in 1963 and 1964, Palmetto Country Club in Benton from 1965 to 1969, and Huntington Park Golf Course in Shreveport in 1970.

Winners
Shreveport Kiwanis Invitational
1970 Sandra Haynie

Shreveport Kiwanis Club Invitational
1969 Sandra Haynie
1968 Carol Mann
1967 Mickey Wright
1966 Mickey Wright

Shreveport Kiwanis Invitational
1965 Kathy Whitworth

Clifford Ann Creed Invitational
1964 Mickey Wright

Alpine Civitan Open
1963 Mickey Wright

References

Former LPGA Tour events
Golf in Louisiana
Sports in Shreveport, Louisiana
Sports in Alexandria, Louisiana
Recurring sporting events established in 1963
Recurring sporting events disestablished in 1970
1963 establishments in Louisiana
1970 disestablishments in Louisiana
History of women in Louisiana